Aidan Morgan (born 7 June 2001) is a New Zealand rugby union player who plays for the  in Super Rugby. His playing position is first five-eighth or fullback. He was named in the Hurricanes squad for the 2022 Super Rugby Pacific season. He was also a member of the  2021 Bunnings NPC squad.

References

External links

2001 births
New Zealand rugby union players
Living people
Rugby union fly-halves
Rugby union fullbacks
Wellington rugby union players
Hurricanes (rugby union) players